Myosotis eximia is a species of flowering plant in the family Boraginaceae endemic to the North Island of New Zealand. The species was described by Donald Petrie. Plants of this species of forget-me-not are perennial and erect, and have ebracteate inflorescences with white corollas.

Taxonomy and Etymology 
Myosotis eximia Petrie is in the plant family Boraginaceae and was originally described in 1915 by Donald Petrie. The species epithet, eximia, means "strikingly unusual".

Phylogeny 
Myosotis eximia was shown to be a part of the monophyletic southern hemisphere lineage of Myosotis in phylogenetic analyses of standard DNA sequencing markers (nuclear ribosomal DNA and chloroplast DNA regions). Within the southern hemisphere lineage, species relationships were not well resolved. The chloroplast sequences of the sole individual of M. eximia were more similar to some species with bracteate inflorescences rather than other North Island species with ebracteate inflorescences.

Description 
Myosotis eximia is an extensively-branched spreading perennial, which forms clusters of tight rosettes with erect, ebracteate flowering stems. The leaves are sparsely covered in dense, straight hairs that lie flat against the leaf. M. eximia flowers in December and January; its flowers, which Petrie described as "large and showy, white with a yellow eye", have projecting anthers. The anthers are only 2 mm long, much shorter than their filaments.

The chromosome number of M. eximia is 2n = 44.

It flowers from December to January and fruits from February to April.

Distribution and habitat 
The species is endemic to New Zealand, and has a very restricted distribution, known only from the Kaimanawa and Ruahine Ranges in the central North Island. It lives in the subalpine to alpine zone, on scree slopes and limestone bluffs. It prefers alkaline soils on limestone or calcareous sandstone.

Conservation status 
M. eximia is listed by the Department of Conservation as "At Risk – Naturally Uncommon" on the most recent assessment (2017-2018) of the New Zealand Threat Classification for plants. Its numbers are thought to be stable, with the qualifiers "DP" (Data Poor) and "RR" (Range Restricted). Because of its specialised habitat requirements, its populations are small and localised, but do not seem to be under threat.

Cultivation 
This species grows surprisingly well in gardens, preferring soil with some added lime, and is often for sale in native plant nurseries. It needs a sunny, well drained situation, and will flower heavily even in warm climates far from its natural subalpine habitat.

References

External links 
Myosotis eximia occurrence data from Australasian Virtual Herbarium

eximia
Endemic flora of New Zealand
Endangered flora of New Zealand
Taxa named by Donald Petrie
Plants described in 1916